Sermon (Bulgarian and Serbian Cyrillic: Сермон) was an early 11th-century voivode (duke) of Syrmia and a local governor in the First Bulgarian Empire, vassal of Bulgarian emperor Samuil. His residence was in Sirmium (today Sremska Mitrovica, Serbia). He was described in Byzantine sources as: "ruler of Syrmia and brother of Nestongos".

Identity and history
Very little is known about him. Even his name may be simply a corruption of the name of Sirmium, added in the text of John Skylitzes in a later commentary. He had a brother, Nestongos, about whom nothing further is known, but who may have been an ancestor of the Nestongos aristocratic family that appears in Byzantium in the 11th–14th centuries.

Following the death of the Bulgarian Tsar Ivan Vladislav in early 1018, Bulgarian resistance against the Byzantine emperor Basil II collapsed. Basil therefore sent his generals to extend his control over the local lords of the northern and western Balkans. While most of them submitted and recognized the emperor's authority, Sermon refused. Consequently, the local Byzantine governor, Constantine Diogenes invited Sermon to a meeting at the estuary of the river Sava in the Danube, where each would only be accompanied by three attendants. Diogenes had hidden his sword in the folds of his clothes, and struck Sermon down. He then marched his army into Sirmium, taking possession of the town. Sermon's wife was sent as a captive to Constantinople, where she married a senior Byzantine official.

Archaeology
Three golden coins produced by Sermon have been found near Novi Sad, in one vineyard in Petrovaradin, which means that this area was also under Sermon's rule. These golden coins are today kept in the Musée de la Ville de Paris, where they are labeled as "Monnaies d'or d'un chef bulgare du XI siècle, Sermon gouverneur de Sirmium" (the golden coins of one Bulgarian ruler from the 11th century, Sermon, the governor of Syrmia). The inscription on the coins is in Medieval Greek, and the English translation of the inscription is: "Madonna, please help Sermon, the duke".

Literature
Veljko Milković, Petrovaradin i Srem - misterija prošlosti, Novi Sad, 2003.
 Monografija Starih Ledinaca, Novi Sad, 1998.

See also

References

Sources

External links
 Sirmium in the Byzantine period

1018 deaths
11th-century Bulgarian people
Medieval Bulgarian military personnel
History of Syrmia
Medieval Bulgarian nobility
11th century in Serbia
Medieval history of Vojvodina